Caires or De Caires may refer to:
 Caires, Portugal, a parish in Amares municipality
 David de Caires (1936–2008), Guyanese solicitor
 Frank De Caires (1909–1959), British Guianese cricketer
 José Alfredo Caires de Nobrega (born 1951), the bishop of the Diocese of Mananjary, Madagascar
 Josh de Caires (born 2002), English cricketer

See also
 Caire (disambiguation)